N-sulphoglucosamine sulphohydrolase is an enzyme that in humans is encoded by the SGSH gene.

Clinical significance 

A number sign (#) is used with this entry because the phenotype is caused by mutation in the gene encoding N-sulfoglucosamine sulfohydrolase (SGSH; MIM 605270). The Sanfilippo syndrome, or mucopolysaccharidosis III, is a lysosomal storage disease due to impaired degradation of heparan sulfate. MPS III includes 4 types, each due to the deficiency of a different enzyme: heparan N-sulfatase (type A); alpha-N-acetylglucosaminidase (type B; MIM 252920); acetyl CoA:alpha-glucosaminide acetyltransferase (type C; MIM 252930); and N-acetylglucosamine 6-sulfatase (type D; MIM 252940). The Sanfilippo syndrome is characterized by severe central nervous system degeneration, but only mild somatic disease. Onset of clinical features usually occurs between 2 and 6 years; severe neurologic degeneration occurs in most patients between 6 and 10 years of age, and death occurs typically during the second or third decade of life. Type A has been reported to be the most severe, with earlier onset and rapid progression of symptoms and shorter survival.

References

Further reading